
Year 848 (DCCCXLVIII) was a leap year starting on Sunday (link will display the full calendar) of the Julian calendar.

Events 
 By place 
 Europe 
 Summer – Bordeaux, capital of Aquitaine, falls into the hands of Viking raiders. King Charles the Bald sends a Frankish fleet to lift the siege. Despite destroying some Viking longships on the Dordogne River, they fail to save the city. The Abbey of Saint-Pierre in Brantôme is sacked.
 Emperor Lothair I, and his (half) brothers Louis the German and Charles the Bald, meet in Koblenz to continue the system of "con-fraternal government".
 Frankish forces under Count (comté) William of Septimania assume authority over the counties of Barcelona and Empúries (modern Spain).
 The Saracens conquer Ragusa (Sicily), after its Byzantine garrison is forced by severe famine to surrender. The city and its castle are razed to the ground.

 Britain 
 The armies of Brycheiniog and Gwent clash in the battle of Ffinnant (Wales). King Ithel of Gwent is killed in the fighting (approximate date).
 Máel Sechnaill mac Maíl Ruanaid, High King of Mide, defeats a Norse Viking army at Sciath Nechtain in Ireland (approximate date).

 Asia 
 The Medieval Cholas in Southern India start to rule (approximate date).

 By topic 
 Religion 
 Pope Leo IV builds (on the opposite of the Tiber River) the Leonine City, a fortified three-kilometre wall that encircles the Vatican Hill and Borgo, to defend Rome.
 The Roman Catholic church of Santa María del Naranco, on the slope of Monte Naranco (Northern Spain), is completed.

Births 
 Alfonso III, king of Asturias (approximate date)
 Carloman, Frankish abbot (d. 877)
 Charles the Child, king of Aquitaine (or 847)
 Lothair the Lame, Frankish abbot (d. 865)
 Onneca Fortúnez, Basque princess (or 850)

Deaths 
 Cui Yuanshi, chancellor of the Tang Dynasty
 Drest X, king of the Picts
 Guo, empress dowager of the Tang Dynasty
 Ithel, king of Gwent (approximate date)
 Li Gongzuo, Chinese writer 
 Malik ibn Kaydar, Muslim governor
 Rechtabhra, bishop of Clonfert
 Shi Xiong, Chinese general
 Sunifred, Frankish nobleman
 Sunyer I, Frankish nobleman
 William I, duke of Gascony
 Yahya al-Laithi, Muslim scholar

References